Independent Days may refer to:
 Independent Days (album), a 2001 album by Backyard Babies
 Independent Days Festival, an Italian music festival
 Independent Days International Filmfest, a German film festival

See also 
 Independents Day (disambiguation)